The Defence Research Laboratory (DRL) is a defence laboratory of the Defence Research and Development Organisation (DRDO) located in Tezpur city of Assam state of India. It conducts research and development studies on vector-borne diseases, improving the quality of drinking water, waste biodegradation and management.

History 

In 2020, with an intent to make the DRDO leaner and more effective, it was proposed to merge the Defence Institute of Bio-Energy Research (DIBER), Defence Institute of High Altitude Research (DIHAR), and "Defence Research Laboratory" (DRL). The collaboration with the Defence Food Research Laboratory and the Central Food Technological Research Institute of the Council of Scientific and Industrial Research (CSIR) will be enhanced.

Organisation 

DRL is headed by a director. The present director of DRL is Dr Dev Vrat Kamboj.

See also
 Defence industry of India

References

External links
 DRL profile

1962 establishments in Assam
Government agencies established in 1962
Defence Research and Development Organisation laboratories
Research and development in India
Research institutes established in 1962
Education in Assam